The 2018 Hong Kong Sevens was the 43rd edition of the Hong Kong Sevens tournament, and the seventh tournament of the 2017–18 World Rugby Sevens Series. The performance from this tournament determined the first fourteen seedings of the 2018 Rugby World Cup Sevens tournament alongside the past year's series and the previous six event of the 2017–18 season.

Fiji won the tournament, defeating Kenya 24–12 in the final. Fiji were dominant throughout the tournament, including a 50–7 thrashing of New Zealand during pool play.

In the World Series Qualifier tournament, Ireland were the dominant team during pool play, but Japan beat Ireland 12–7 in the semifinal, and went on to beat Germany 19–14 in the final to qualify for the 2018-19 World Series as a core team.

Main draw

Teams 

The main tournament will consist of the fifteen core teams and one invited team, South Korea.

Format 
As in the last tournament, there will be a main draw with the fifteen World Series core teams and one invited team. The teams are drawn into four pools of four teams each. Each team plays all the others in their pool once. 3, 2 or 1 points for a win, draw or loss. The top two teams from each pool advance to the Cup brackets. The bottom two teams go into the Challenge trophy brackets.

Pool stage
All times in Hong Kong Time (UTC+08:00). The games as scheduled are as follows:

Pool A

Pool B

Pool C

Pool D

Knockout stage

13th place

Challenge Trophy

5th place

Cup

Tournament placings

Source: World Rugby

Players

Scoring leaders

Source: World Rugby

Dream team
The following seven players were selected to the tournament dream team at the conclusion of the tournament:

World Series qualifier

Continental qualifying 
Teams will qualify for the World Series Qualifier tournament based on continental championships. The top teams from each continent that are not already core teams will qualify. For the 2018 edition, Europe has been given a third spot, whereas North America was given a single spot. The other continents remain with two spots each.

Format 

The qualifying tournament features twelve teams divided into three pools of four teams each. Each team plays all the others in their pool once. The top eight teams (the top two from each group, plus the two best third-place finishers) qualify to the quarterfinals of the knockout round. The winner of the knockout round will be given core status in the 2018–19 World Series.

Pool stage
All times in Hong Kong Time (UTC+08:00). The games as scheduled are as follows:

Pool E

Pool F

Pool G

Third place tiebreaker

Knockout stage

Overall record

See also
2018 Hong Kong Women's Sevens
2018 Rugby World Cup Sevens – Men's tournament

References

External links
 Tournament Page

2018
rugby union
2017–18 World Rugby Sevens Series
2018 in Asian rugby union
Hong Kong Sevens